This article show all participating team squads at the 2015 Girls' Youth Pan-American Volleyball Cup, played by sixteen countries with the final round held in Cuba

Pool A

The following is the Dominican roster in the 2015 Girls' Youth Pan-American Volleyball Cup.

Head Coach:  Alexandre Ceccato

The following is the Argentinean roster in the 2015 Girls' Youth Pan-American Volleyball Cup.

Head Coach:  Mauro Silvestre

The following is the Peruvian roster in the 2015 Girls' Youth Pan-American Volleyball Cup.

Head Coach:  Juan Diego García

The following is the Mexican roster in the 2015 Girls' Youth Pan-American Volleyball Cup.

Head Coach:  Ricardo Naranjo

Pool B

The following is the Cuban roster in the 2015 Girls' Youth Pan-American Volleyball Cup.

Head Coach:  Tomas Fernandez

The following is the Puerto Rican roster in the 2015 Girls' Youth Pan-American Volleyball Cup.

Head Coach:  Luis Aponte

The following is the Chilean roster in the 2015 Girls' Youth Pan-American Volleyball Cup.

Head Coach:  Hugo Jauregui

The following is the Costa Rican roster in the 2015 Girls' Youth Pan-American Volleyball Cup.

Head Coach:  Andres Lopez Castro

References

External links
Official website

Women's Pan-American Volleyball Cup
Pan American Volleyball Cup
Girls Youth Pan American Volleyball Cup
Volleyball